Nar Nar Goon railway station is located on the Gippsland line in Victoria, Australia. It serves the town of Nar Nar Goon, and it opened on 1 April 1881.

In 1953, the line between Nar Nar Goon and Tynong was duplicated. In 1954, the line to Pakenham was duplicated, electrification of the line between Pakenham and Warragul occurred, and a signal panel was provided. In 1958, the present island platform was provided.

In 1993, siding "A" was abolished, as was a crossover and the Up end connection to the former goods yard, with No.2 road baulked at the Down end of the Koo Wee Rup Road level crossing. In 1996, No.3 road was abolished, and No.2 road was shortened in length. In 1999, all remaining points were removed.

In 1998, electrified services between Pakenham and Warragul ceased, with de-electrification between those stations occurring in 2001.

On 28 April 2006, the signal panel at the station was abolished.

Platforms and services

Nar Nar Goon has one island platform with two faces. It is serviced by V/Line Traralgon and selected Bairnsdale line services.

Platform 1:
  services to Southern Cross in the morning and early afternoon
  services to Traralgon and Bairnsdale in the late afternoon and evening

Platform 2:
  services to Traralgon and Bairnsdale in the morning and early afternoon
  services to Southern Cross in the late afternoon and evening

Transport links

Warragul Bus Lines operates two routes via Nar Nar Goon station, under contract to Public Transport Victoria:
to Garfield station
Pakenham station – Garfield station

References

External links
Victorian Railway Stations Gallery
Melway map

Railway stations in Australia opened in 1881
Regional railway stations in Victoria (Australia)
Railway stations in the Shire of Cardinia